Magnus August Høiberg (born 29 November 1987), known professionally as Cashmere Cat, is a Norwegian DJ, record producer, songwriter and musician. He is best known for producing songs for artists including Kanye West, The Kid Laroi, Selena Gomez, Camila Cabello, Ariana Grande, Tory Lanez, Major Lazer, The Weeknd, and Kali Uchis as well as his own critically acclaimed musical output. 

His debut EP, Mirror Maru, was released in October 2012 and followed by the full length albums 9, in 2017, and Princess Catgirl, in 2019. 

Høiberg has toured the world over, performing at festivals including Coachella (US), Lollapalooza (US), Hangout (US), Firefly (US), Ultra (US), Clockenflap (HK), Sonar (ES), Roskilde (DK), Lowlands (NL), Pukkelpop (BE), Falls Festival (AUS) and Øya (Nor).

Career

2006–15: Early years, Mirror Maru and Wedding Bells 
As a teenager, Høiberg began producing music and teaching himself how to DJ. He represented Norway in the DMC World DJ Championships from 2006 to 2009 under the pseudonym DJ Final. 

Høiberg's debut extended play (EP) as Cashmere Cat, Mirror Maru, was released on 22 October 2012 on French label Pelican Fly. The diversity and influence of multiple genres gained support from notables such as Hudson Mohawke, Rustie and Gilles Peterson.  

He continued to gain recognition with a number of remixes, including his edits of 2 Chainz' "No Lie," Lana Del Rey's "National Anthem," Miguel's "Do You..." and Jeremih's "773 Love." In January 2013, producer, songwriter and musician Benny Blanco invited Cashmere to New York to collaborate on production work and helped book his first. In 2013 Cashmere Cat also played his first concerts in the United States. That summer, he moved from Norway to Manhattan. 

On 11 February 2014, Høiberg's second EP Wedding Bells was released on UK label LuckyMe. In August same year, he produced and featured on "Be My Baby" from Ariana Grande's second studio album My Everything. He was also the opening act during Grande's North American The Honeymoon Tour.

2016–present: 9, Princess Catgirl, other contributions 
On 28 February 2016, Cashmere confirmed that his debut studio album, 9, was on the way. Ahead of the album, Cashmere Cat release singles "Wild Love" featuring The Weeknd and Francis and the Lights; "Trust Nobody" featuring Selena Gomez and Tory Lanez; "Love Incredible" featuring Camila Cabello and co-produced by Sophie; and "9 (After Coachella)" featuring MØ and Sophie.   The album was released on the 28th of April 2017 with further contributions from Kehlani, Kacy Hill, Ariana Grande, Ty Dolla Sign and Jhené Aiko. 

Cashmere co-produced "Wolves", alongside Sinjin Hawke, for Kanye West's 2016 studio album The Life of Pablo.

In 2018, Cashmere Cat co-produced album tracks for Kanye West (Kids See Ghosts) and Nas. He continued to produce for a number of artists, with notable credits on Benny Blanco's debut single, the global hit "Eastside" with Halsey and Khalid and Shawn Mendes and Camila Cabello's global hit "Señorita".

Cashmere Cat's second album, Princess Catgirl, was released on September 20, 2019 featuring singles "Emotions" and "For Your Eyes Only."

Cashmere Cat co-wrote and co-produced The Kid Laroi's 2021 song "Stay" (with Justin Bieber), which went on to reach number one on the Billboard Hot 100 in August 2021.

Discography 

9 (2017)
Princess Catgirl (2019)

Awards and nominations

References

External links 
 Cashmere Cat at SoundCloud

1987 births
Living people
Norwegian DJs
Norwegian electronic musicians
Norwegian record producers
Future bass musicians
Spellemannprisen winners
Electronic dance music DJs